St Columba College is a Catholic and Anglican school in Andrews Farm, a northern suburb of Adelaide, South Australia.

The school has three campuses (junior, middle and senior) on both sides of President Avenue, the main street through the suburb of Andrews Farm. It is one of the leading schools in Adelaide's North, with over 1400 students across Reception to Year 12.

St Columba College was the first joint Catholic and Anglican coeducational school in Australia. It was established in 1996 (first students 1997) as an ecumenical initiative by Ian George and Leonard Faulkner, the Anglican and Catholic archbishops of Adelaide at the time.

Notable alumni
Awer Mabil, football player in the national team (graduated 2013; Alumni of the Year 2022)

References 

Anglican primary schools in Adelaide
Catholic primary schools in Adelaide
1996 establishments in Australia
Catholic secondary schools in Adelaide
Anglican secondary schools in Adelaide
Educational institutions established in 1996